Edward Everett Denison (August 28, 1873 – June 17, 1953) was a U.S. Representative from Illinois.

Early life 
Born in Marion, Illinois, Denison attended the public schools. He was graduated from Baylor University, Waco, Texas, in 1895, from Yale University, in 1896, and from Columbian University (now George Washington University), Washington, D.C., in 1899. He was admitted to the bar in 1899 and commenced practice in Marion in 1900. He engaged in the banking business for one year.

Career 
Denison was elected as a Republican to the Sixty-fourth and to the seven succeeding Congresses (March 4, 1915 – March 3, 1931). He was an unsuccessful candidate for reelection in 1930 to the Seventy-second Congress and for election in 1932 to the Seventy-third Congress.

He resumed the general practice of law in Marion. He was an unsuccessful candidate for circuit judge of the first judicial circuit of Illinois in 1939.

Death 
He died in Carbondale, Illinois on June 17, 1953. He was interred in Maplewood Cemetery in Marion.

References

 A. Le Braz, « Quelques grandes minutes américaines », revue des deux Mondes, 1919, pp. 609 à 611

1873 births
1953 deaths
Republican Party members of the United States House of Representatives from Illinois
People from Marion, Illinois
Baylor University alumni
Yale University alumni
George Washington University Law School alumni